Symphonic is a compilation album by Jørn Lande's solo project Jorn. The album differs from the previous compilation albums in how orchestra arrangements have been added to Jorn songs. The album was released on January 25, 2013 in Europe and January 22, 2013 in North America.

The album contains 15 tracks ranging from Jorn's 2004 album, Out to Every Nation, to the 2012 release Bring Heavy Rock to the Land. In addition, it includes cover versions of the Dio track "Rock and Roll Children" and Black Sabbath's "The Mob Rules".

Track listing
 "I Came to Rock" – 6:33 (Jorn Lande, Jimmy Iversen)
 "Rock and Roll Children" – 4:27 (Ronnie James Dio)
 "The World I See" – 6:29 (Lande, Tore Moren)
 "Burn Your Flame" – 3:30 (Lande, J. Bøgeberg)
 "Man Of The Dark" – 5:14 (Lande, Lofstad)
 "My Road" – 2:46 (Lande)
 "Time to be King" – 4:24 (Masterplan cover)
 "Black Morning" – 4:37 (Lande, Iversen)
 "Like Stone In Water" – 5:19 (Lande, Moren, Jorn Viggo Lofstad)
 "Vision Eyes" – 4:56 (Lande, Lofstad)
 "War Of The World" – 5:29 (Lande, Lofstad)
 "Behind The Clown" – 4:12 (Lande, Lofstad)
 "A Thousand Cuts" – 9:01 (Lande, Moren)
 "Mob Rules" – 4:06 (Black Sabbath cover)
 "Through Day And Night" (Japan bonus track) (Lande, Lofstad)

Personnel

Musicians
Jørn Lande – lead vocals
Tore Moren – guitars
Jimmy Iversen – guitars
Jorn Viggo Lofstad – guitars on tracks 5, 9, 10, 11, 12, 15
Nic Angileri – bass
Magnus Rosén – bass on tracks 10, 12, 15
Sid Ringsby – bass on tracks 9, 11
Willy Bendiksen – drums
Stian Kristoffersen – drums on tracks 10, 12, 15
Lasse Lazz Jensen – Symphony Programing on All tracks and guitar on My Road

Production
Produced by Jørn Lande
 Mixing and mastering by Tommy Hansen
 Artwork by Felipe Machado Franco

Release history

References 

2013 albums
Frontiers Records albums
Jørn Lande albums